Apex Nature Park is a public, urban park in Apex, North Carolina. Located at 2500 and 2600 Evans Road, it is on the south west side of Apex. It is bordered by Apex Barbecue Road on the East.

The park is split into two distinct sections: the Apex Nature Park and the Seymour Athletic Fields.

Apex Nature Park
The Nature Park boasts an amphitheater with grass-tiered seating, an 18-hole disc golf course, a picnic shelter, multi-use trails, and environmental education stations.  It is also home to one of the city's dog parks.

Seymour Athletic Fields
The Seymour Athletic fields have basketball courts, lighted tennis and pickleball courts, lighted soccer/multi use fields, sand volleyball courts, a picnic shelter, and a multi-age playground.

References

Apex, North Carolina
Urban public parks
Parks in Wake County, North Carolina
Tourist attractions in Apex, North Carolina
Dog parks in the United States